The TCB Band is a group of musicians who formed the rhythm section of Elvis Presley’s band from August 1969 until his death in 1977. (Depending on the context, the nickname may also extend to Elvis’ background vocalists during that same period: the Imperials and the Sweet Inspirations). The initials TCB stand for Taking Care of Business, a personal motto Presley adopted in the early 1970s. Although personnel changed over the years, the original members were James Burton (lead guitar), Jerry Scheff (bass), John Wilkinson (rhythm guitar), Larry Muhoberac (keyboards) and Ron Tutt (drums). They first appeared live at Presley’s first Las Vegas performance at what was then known as the International Hotel (later the Las Vegas Hilton, now Westgate Las Vegas Resort and Casino) on July 31, 1969.

History
When planning his return to live performing after his successful 1968 NBC television comeback, Presley had to replace original band members Scotty Moore, D.J. Fontana (who had returned to session work) and Bill Black who had formed the Bill Black Combo before his death in 1965.  Elvis’ first call was to guitarist James Burton, who was from Ricky Nelson's band, whom he asked to help form the group after knowing about him for many years and seeing him on television. After keyboardist Glen D. Hardin declined Burton's offer to join the group, Larry Muhoberac, who had played on several of Presley's movie soundtrack sessions, accepted his offer to perform. Burton later added Jerry Scheff on bass and John Wilkinson on rhythm guitar. Muhoberac suggested Ron Tutt for the drums to round out the section. By February 1970, Glen D. Hardin joined on keyboards, eventually replacing Muhoberac who returned to studio work in Los Angeles. At that time Bob Lanning, a Los Angeles session drummer joined on drums, replacing Tutt who returned later that year. TCB brought a new lease on life to Elvis's rock 'n' roll sound of the 50s.  Larrie Londin, a Nashville session drummer who recorded and occasionally toured with Presley over a nine-year period, filled in for Tutt on occasion during 1976 and 1977 performances.

In 1975, Burton, Tutt and Muhoberac backed Johnny Cash on his album, John R. Cash.

Tours with other musicians: After the TCB Band disbanded

Before Presley's death in 1977, several former members from the TCB Band went on to form Emmylou Harris's Hot Band and The John Denver Band. These musicians include James Burton, Glen D. Hardin, Emory Gordy Jr. and Jerry Scheff. Burton left the Hot Band in 1976 and was replaced by English guitarist Albert Lee. Scheff was never a member of the Hot Band. Gordy left John Denver's band in 1980 (he re-joined the band and toured with John shortly in 1989) and was replaced by Scheff. Burton, Hardin and Scheff remained in John Denver's band until early 1994, and was then replaced by Pete Huttlinger, Chris Nole and Alan Deremo.

After drumming a few years with the Jerry Garcia Band before Presley's death, Ron Tutt was invited by Neil Diamond to become Diamond's permanent concert and recording session drummer.  Tutt's drumming has since become a feature to Diamond's concert shows, punctuating moments in the Diamond concert with his TCB Band style drum fills and cymbal crashes.  Tutt is a workman celebrity drummer, and routinely receives concert crowd ovations when he appears and takes his seat at his drum kit.  Noteworthy during concerts is Tutt's soaring drum work on the song, "Holly Holy".  Tutt has been recording and touring with Diamond to the present day.

Tutt also appears on several of recordings by Nancy Sinatra.

Reunions (1979, 1981, 1987, 1997–present)

The TCB Band reunited with a new lineup to record their own album in 1979 of covers of Elvis Presley songs as a tribute.  They also reunited in 1981 as the backing band for Tony Sheridan, augmented by Klaus Voormann and again mostly featuring Sheridan's recordings of Elvis Presley songs.

Several members of the TCB band (Glen Hardin on piano, James Burton on lead guitar, Jerry Scheff on upright bass, and Ron Tutt on drums) also played with Roy Orbison in his 1987 live performance Roy Orbison and Friends, A Black and White Night.

Burton, Hardin, Scheff and Tutt reunited again in 1997 to perform Elvis: The Concert, with John Wilkinson rejoining for the 25th anniversary concert in Memphis. Since then, Burton, Hardin, Tutt and Scheff have toured frequently together, typically backing Austrian singer Dennis Jale and his band, mostly playing music from Elvis Presley's catalogue. They have also backed Greg Page of the Wiggles for two solo albums and some live concerts.

However, after the 30th anniversary concert in 2007, Scheff departed the band and was replaced on tour by Nathan East and Norbert Putnam. Wilkinson died on January 11, 2013, from cancer, at the age of 67.  Putnam and East departed the band in 2013.  The TCB Band currently continues to tour backing Dennis Jale and his band. In 2019, for the first time since 2014, the TCB Band performed a new Elvis: The Concert-style show, alongside the Royal Philharmonic Orchestra, combining elements from the 2016-2018 Presley/Philharmonic tours with the old 1997-2014 TCB Band tours.

Members

Current Members:
 James Burton — lead guitar (1969–1977, 1979, 1981, 1987, 1997–present); vocals (1979)
 Glen D. Hardin — keyboards, piano (1970–1976, 1979, 1981, 1987, 1997–present)

Former Members:
 John Wilkinson — rhythm guitar (1969–1977, April 1989, August 16, 2002; died 2013)
 Jerry Scheff — bass, double bass (1969–1973, 1975–1977, 1979, 1987, 1997–2011, 2022)
 Larry Muhoberac — keyboards, piano, electric piano (1969; died 2016)
 Ronnie Tutt — drums (1969–1977, 1979, 1981, 1987, 1997–2021); vocals (1979) (died 2021)
 Bob Lanning — drums (1970)
 Eddie Graham — percussion (1970–1971)
 Jerome 'Stump' Monroe — drums (1971, 1975, June 24, 1977)
 Emory Gordy Jr. – bass, rhythm guitar (1973, 1979, 1981)
 Duke Bardwell — bass (1974–1975)
 David Briggs — electric piano, clavinet, piano (1975–1977)
 Shane Keister — piano, Moog synthesizer (1976)
 Tony Brown — piano (1976–1977)
 Larrie Londin — drums (March 1976, June 25–26, 1977; died 1992)
 Bobby Ogdin — electric piano, clavinet (1977)
 Tony Smith — rhythm guitar (1997–2007)
 Norbert Putnam — bass (2009–2013)
 Nathan East — bass (2009–2013)

Timeline

Discography

Studio Album
The TCB Band (recorded in 1978, but never released until it was leaked on sale)
"Mystery Train" (Ronnie on lead vocals)
"Hound Dog" (Ronnie on lead vocals)
"That's Alright Mama" (James on lead vocals)
"Jailhouse Rock" (Ronnie on lead vocals)
"Suspicious Minds" (Ronnie on lead vocals)
"Burnin' Love" (Ronnie on lead vocals)
"Love Me" (Ronnie on lead vocals)
"Little Sister" (Ronnie on lead vocals)
"Heartbreak Hotel" (James on lead vocals)
"Falling In Love with You" (Ronnie on lead vocals)

References

External links
Official TCB Band Fan Club

1969 establishments in the United States
1977 disestablishments in the United States
American rock music groups
American pop music groups
Elvis Presley
Musical groups established in 1969
Musical groups disestablished in 1977
Musical groups reestablished in 1997